Nadaka Nature Park is a  public park in Gresham, Oregon.

References

External links

 

Gresham, Oregon
Parks in Oregon